Margot Kober (born 20 February 1965) is an Austrian cross-country skier. She competed in three events at the 1988 Winter Olympics.

Cross-country skiing results

Olympic Games

World Cup

Season standings

References

1965 births
Living people
Austrian female cross-country skiers
Olympic cross-country skiers of Austria
Cross-country skiers at the 1988 Winter Olympics
Sportspeople from Tyrol (state)
20th-century Austrian women